Calcutta! is an album by Lawrence Welk and His Orchestra. It was released in 1961 on the Dot label (catalog no. DLP-3359). The album featured Frank Scott at the harpsichord and included Welk's No. 1 hit single, "Calcutta".

The album debuted on Billboard magazine's popular albums chart on January 30, 1961, held the No. 1 spot for 11 weeks, and remained on that chart for 50 weeks. It was certified as a gold record by the RIAA.

AllMusic later gave the album a rating of four stars. Reviewer Greg Adams praised its "brisk rhythms, hand claps, wordless chorus, and prominent melody" as "an infectious instrumental."

Track listing
Side 1
 "Calcutta"(Heino Gaze) [2:12]
 "Sailor (Your Home Is the Sea)" (Busch, Holt, Scharfenberger) [2:13]
 "Perfidia" (Leeds, Dominguez) [2:00]
 "April in Portugal" (Ferrao, Galhardo, Larue) [2:05]
 "Humoresque Boogie" (Welk, Cates) [2:08]
 "Corrine Corrina" (Williams, Chatman Parish) [2:17]

Side 2
 "Bombay" [2:08]
 "Mam'selle" [1:55]
 "Mountain King" [2:32]
 "Blue Tango" [2:10]
 "Ruby" [2:30]
 "Save the Last Dance for Me" [2:33]

References

1961 albums
Dot Records albums
Lawrence Welk albums